The Lord Howe woodhen (Hypotaenidia sylvestris) also known as the Lord Howe Island woodhen or Lord Howe (Island) rail, is a flightless bird of the rail family, (Rallidae). It is endemic to Lord Howe Island off the Australian coast. It is currently classified as endangered by the IUCN.

Description
The Lord Howe woodhen is a small olive brown bird, with a short tail and a downcurved bill. Wings are chestnut with darker bars. The eyes have a red iris.

Ecology
The species lives in sub-tropical forests, feeding on earthworms, crustaceans, fruit, and occasionally taking the eggs of shearwaters and petrels.

Woodhens mate for life and are usually encountered in pairs. They are territorial and will appear from the forest's understory to investigate the source of any unusual noise. A mated pair will defend an area of approximately three hectares, with offspring being expelled from this area once grown. The population of birds is thus restricted by the amount of available territory.

Decline and recovery 

When explorers first discovered Lord Howe Island in 1788, they identified 15 bird species including the then common woodhen. Being flightless, curious, and having never been hunted, they became a readily available source of food for visiting sailors and the island's early human population. Since its discovery and the arrival of settlers on the island in 1834, nine of these 15 species became extinct. The woodhen declined in numbers until the late 1970s, when surveys showed that the population had dropped to less than 30 birds, confined to the difficult to access summit regions of the island's two mountains, Mount Gower and Mount Lidgbird. The woodhen was at the very brink of extinction in 1980, with just 15 individuals found.

A comprehensive study was carried out to determine the cause of the decline, which was eventually attributed to the introduction of feral pigs. The elimination of the pigs and other disruptive animals (goats), plus a programme of ex-situ conservation (captive breeding) which commenced in May 1980 (the first egg was laid in June 1980), allowed the Lord Howe woodhen to recover its numbers. The captive breeding program was funded with $150,000 from the Foundation for National Parks & Wildlife, which was spent to construct the compound and to employ scientists involved in this project.

In 2007–2008 there were about 250 birds on the island, which may be the optimal population size for this area. The population of adult birds in 2018 was 212.
Following a successful rodent eradication on Lord Howe Island from 2019-2021, the woodhen population has increased significantly. A woodhen survey in 2021 found 598 birds, and in a further survey in March 2022 there were thought to be at least 779.

The analysis of the threats to the Lord Howe woodhen, and the implemented solution, is considered a model for conservation biology. A number of possible causes of the decline were identified on the island, from introduced rats to Tasmanian masked owls. However, only the elimination of the pigs would have saved the species from extinction, and identifying the cause and solution in a timely manner was crucial to the success of the programme.

Following success with the woodhen, there have been recovery efforts for other endemic species on Lord Howe Island, including the Lord Howe flax snail (Placostylus bivaricosus) and the Lord Howe currawong (Strepera graculina crissalis).

Gilbert rail
A  rail, known only from a single specimen in the form of an alcohol-preserved skin at Harvard, was originally believed to have been collected on one of the Gilbert Islands and named as the Gilbert rail, Gallirallus conditicius (Peters & Griscom, 1928).

However, the island attributed to this holotype is low, rocky and sandy, and has no habitat suitable for a rail.

It now appears that a curatorial error led to the specimen being labeled to the wrong collection, and the specimen is actually an immature female Lord Howe woodhen. It differs from that species only in a paler crown, throat and underparts, and browner head, but long immersion in alcohol could have changed the colour. The island to which the specimen was originally attributed is 4,500 km from Lord Howe Island, and it appears improbable that two flightless rails could evolve separately with no morphological differences.

References

External links
Image of an egg of a Lord Howe woodhen (Australian Museum website)

Hypotaenidia
Birds of Lord Howe Island
Endangered fauna of Australia
Birds described in 1869
Flightless birds
Taxa named by Philip Sclater